1952 Academy Awards may refer to:

 24th Academy Awards, the Academy Awards ceremony that took place in 1952
 25th Academy Awards, the 1953 ceremony honoring the best in film for 1952